"Another Place, Another Time" is a song written by Bob McDill and Paul Harrison, and recorded by American country music artist Don Williams.  It was released in March 1988 as the second single from the album Traces.  The song reached number 5 on the Billboard Hot Country Singles & Tracks chart.

Charts

Weekly charts

Year-end charts

References

1988 singles
Don Williams songs
Songs written by Bob McDill
Song recordings produced by Garth Fundis
Capitol Records Nashville singles
1988 songs